Dorjan Bubeqi (born 26 October 1978) is a retired Albanian footballer who currently serves as manager of Besa Kavajë in the Albanian First Division.

Club career
Bubeqi began his playing career in Besa Kavajë's youth system as a centre-forward. He was a member of the 1992–93 Besa U19 championship winning team. Bubeqi made his professional league debut on 7 September 1996 for Albpetroli Patos in a 1–3 loss against Dinamo Tirana. The following year he joined Shkumbini Peqin and went on to finish as the league's top scorer with 26 goals. His playing career spanned 17 seasons competing with 8 different clubs. He scored 172 goals in 395 career matches.

Managerial career
In January 2018, he was named coach at Korabi Peshkopi after he had left Erzeni a few days earlier.

References

1978 births
Living people
Footballers from Kavajë
Albanian footballers
Association football forwards
KS Albpetrol Patos players
KS Shkumbini Peqin players
Besa Kavajë players
Luftëtari Gjirokastër players
KF Apolonia Fier players
KF Bylis Ballsh players
KS Lushnja players
FK Tomori Berat players
Albanian football managers
Besa Kavajë managers
KF Korabi Peshkopi managers